Cadott is a village in Chippewa County in the U.S. state of Wisconsin. The population was 1,437 at the 2010 census.

History
In the late 1700s or early 1800s Jean Baptiste Cadotte, son of French Canadian fur trader Michel Cadotte of the Madeline Island area, established a trading post on the Yellow River near modern Cadott.

In 1865 the village at the current site was founded by Robert Marriner, who built a dam and sawmill on the river and platted the town. Marriner named it "Cadotte Falls" after the earlier trading post.

On July 21, 2020, a tornado hit the north side of the village. It damaged structures, but did not injure anybody.

Geography
Cadott is located at  (44.948515, -91.151304).

Cadott has the distinction of being equidistant from the Equator and North Pole. Billboards on Hwy. 27 between Cadott and Cornell offer tourists the opportunity to be photographed by the unusual signs.

Demographics

2010 census
As of the census of 2010, there were 1,437 people, 605 households, and 369 families living in the village. The racial makeup of the village was 98.1% White, 0.3% African American, 0.1% Native American, 0.4% Asian, and 1.1% from two or more races. Hispanic or Latino of any race were 0.5% of the population.

There were 605 households, of which 34.0% had children under the age of 18 living with them, 41.0% were married couples living together, 15.0% had a female householder with no husband present, 5.0% had a male householder with no wife present, and 39.0% were non-families. 33.9% of all households were made up of individuals, and 16.7% had someone living alone who was 65 years of age or older. The average household size was 2.32 and the average family size was 2.98.

The median age in the village was 36.5 years. 27.2% of residents were under the age of 18; 8.3% were between the ages of 18 and 24; 23.6% were from 25 to 44; 23.3% were from 45 to 64; and 17.5% were 65 years of age or older. The gender makeup of the village was 47.5% male and 52.5% female.

2000 census
As of the census of 2000, there were 1,345 people, 562 households, and 382 families living in the village. The population density was 405.1 people per square mile (156.4/km2). There were 581 housing units at an average density of 175.0 per square mile (67.6/km2). The racial makeup of the village was 98.81% White, 0.07% African American, 0.07% Native American, 0.52% Asian, 0.07% from other races, and 0.45% from two or more races. Hispanic or Latino of any race were 0.15% of the population.

There were 562 households, out of which 32.7% had children under the age of 18 living with them, 51.8% were married couples living together, 12.1% had a female householder with no husband present, and 31.9% were non-families. 28.8% of all households were made up of individuals, and 16.7% had someone living alone who was 65 years of age or older. The average household size was 2.37 and the average family size was 2.90.

In the village, the population was spread out, with 27.0% under the age of 18, 10.0% from 18 to 24, 25.0% from 25 to 44, 18.4% from 45 to 64, and 19.6% who were 65 years of age or older. The median age was 38 years. For every 100 females, there were 96.1 males. For every 100 females age 18 and over, there were 86.7 males.

The median income for a household in the village was $33,295, and the median income for a family was $38,333. Males had a median income of $27,014 versus $20,000 for females. The per capita income for the village was $15,778. About 6.8% of families and 8.5% of the population were below the poverty line, including 8.8% of those under age 18 and 11.3% of those age 65 or over.

Education
The community is served by the School District of Cadott Community.

Athletics
The Cadott High School wrestling program has included many state champions as well as team championships. Cadott was D3 state champion in 2007 and state runner up in 2005.

Rock Fest and Country Fest
Since 1988, Cadott has hosted hosts two annual music festivals, Country Fest and Rock Fest. The camping and concert area is roughly eight miles outside the village. Both music festivals attract fans nationwide and include some of the top singers and bands from each genre. As a result, the events have a significant impact on the local economy.

See also
 List of villages in Wisconsin

References

Further reading
 Cadott Community Centennial, 1865-1965. Cadott, Wis.: n.p., 1965.
 Post, Laraine and Cadott Centennial Committee. Cadott Centennial, 1895-1995: The Community Celebrates. Cadott, Wisconsin: The Cadott Sentinel, 1995.
 Sand, Ken. The Centennial Book of Cadott High School 1883-1983. Cadott, Wis.: Centennial Committee, 1983.
 Tobola, Thomas H. Cadotte Family Stories. Cadott, Wis., 1974.
 Zenner, Anthony A. Cadott, the Spot That God Forgot... Not. Old Town, Florida: T.H.E. Instrumentation & Publishing Company, 2009.

External links

 
 Cadott Chamber of Commerce
 Sanborn fire insurance maps:  1894 1900 1912 1930

Villages in Chippewa County, Wisconsin
Villages in Wisconsin
Eau Claire–Chippewa Falls metropolitan area